Buck Pond may refer to:

 Buck Pond (Navarre, Florida)
 Buck Pond (Big Moose, New York)
 Buck Pond (McKeever, New York)
 Buck Pond (Nehasane Lake, New York)
 Buck Pond (Stillwater, New York)